The 1916 Chattanooga Moccasins football team represented the University of Chattanooga—now known as the University of Tennessee at Chattanooga—as a member of the Southern Intercollegiate Athletic Association (SIAA) during the 1916 college football season. Led by Johnny Spiegel in his second and final year as head coach, the Moccasins compiled an overall record of 3–5 with a mark of 1–4 in conference play.

Schedule

References

Chattanooga
Chattanooga Mocs football seasons
Chattanooga Moccasins football